Luis Carlos Mendoza Burgos (born 27 March 1970) is a Venezuelan professional football manager and former player who is a technical director for USL League Two club Weston FC.

Early life 
Born in Caracas, Venezuela, Mendoza attended the Colegio Santo Tomás de Aquino between 1975 and 1981, playing youth football for the school.

Playing career 
Mendoza represented Venezuela National team 1988 Suramericano Juvenil, represented Venezuela National team 1992 Preolimpics Paraguay, ,represented Caracas at the 1993 Copa CONMEBOL in two games, and at the 1995 Copa Libertadores in six games. He also played for the New Jersey Stallions in the United States, scoring 14 goals in the USL League Two between 1997 and 2002.

Managerial career 
Between 2000 and 2003, Mendoza coached the New Jersey Stallions. After having been the director of coaching of New Jersey-based youth academy TSF Academy, Mendoza was appointed technical director of Weston FC's youth setup on 2 July 2019.

Personal life 

References

1970 births
Living people
Footballers from Caracas
Venezuelan footballers
Association football midfielders
Caracas FC players
New Jersey Stallions players
Venezuelan Primera División players
USISL Select League players
Venezuelan football managers
Venezuelan expatriate footballers
Expatriate footballers in Italy
Expatriate soccer players in the United States
Expatriate soccer managers in the United States
Venezuelan expatriate sportspeople in Italy
Venezuelan expatriate sportspeople in the United States
Monagas S.C. managers